Podkraj ( or ) is a small settlement in the hills south of Ravne na Koroškem in the Carinthia region in northern Slovenia.

References

External links
Podkraj on Geopedia

Populated places in the Municipality of Ravne na Koroškem